The International Association for the Study of Silk Road Textiles (IASSRT) was founded in 2015 to promote and develop the study of textiles around the world, in particular textiles of the Silk Road. Presidency of IASSRT changes annually, with the incumbent director responsible for organising the next annual conference.

Aims 
In October 2015, the International Association for the Study of Silk Road Textiles (IASSRT) was founded in Hangzhou for the purpose to connect the research institutions along the Silk Road and other related institutions (including universities, museums, libraries, archaeological institutions, research institutions, and research groups, etc.) for the cooperation in collaborative researches and sharing resources.

Membership 
Membership of IASSRT is by election, and chiefly consists of museums and research organisations with specific interests in Silk Road textiles, and distinguished individuals.
Group Members
 Tracing Patterns Foundation, Berkeley
 International Academy of Indian Culture
 Musée Des Tissus, Lyon (France)
 National Museum of Denmark
 The Swedish History Museum (Historiska Museet)
 Max Planck Institute for the History of Science (MPIWG)
 McDonald Institute, University of Cambridge
 Needham Research Institute (NRI)
 International Dunhuang Project (IDP), British Library
 China National Silk Museum, Hangzhou (China)
 State Hermitage Museum, Russia
 Institute of Archeology of Academy of Sciences, Republic of Uzbekistan
 Chengdu Museum, China
 Institute of Archaeology of Xinjiang, China
 ICOMOS International Conservation Center, Xi'an, China (IICC-X)
 Fashion • Art Design Institute of Donghua University, China
 Institute for the History of Natural Science, Chinese Academy of Sciences
 Collaborative Innovation Center for the Cooperation and Development of the Belt and Road of the Zhejiang University
 Community of Chinese Museums along the Silk Road, China
 Center for Research on Ancient Chinese History, Peking University, China
 Queen Sirikit Textile Museum, Thailand
 Bryant University, USA
 Padova University, Italy
 Israel Antiquities Authority (IAA)
 Institute of Ancient History and Archaeology of the Northern Caucasus (Stavropol), Russia
 Nasledie llc. (Stavropol), Russia
 Korea National University of Culture Heritage
 ASEAN Traditional Textile Art Community (ASEANTTAC)，Indonesia
 The Danish National Research Foundation’s Center for Textile Research (CTR)
 International Dunhuang Project (IDP), British Library, UK
 Needham Research Institute (NRI), UK
 McDonald Institute for Archaeological Research, University of Cambridge, UK
 Max Planck Institute for the History of Science (MPIWG), Germany
Individual members:
 Helen Wang
 Dominique Cardon

Conferences 
IASSRT conferences are held annually, the aim being to bring researchers together on a regular basis, and to visit collections in the location of the conference.
 1st annual conference, Oct 2016: "Silks from the Silk Road:Origin, Transmission and Exchange" at the China National Silk Museum, Hangzhou (China)
 2nd annual conference, Nov 2017: "Dialogue with Silk between Europe and Asia: History, Technology and Art", at Musee Gadagne, Lyon (France)
 3rd annual conference, Nov 2018: "Silk Road Textiles: Tangible and Intangible Cultural Heritage" in Korea National University of Cultural Heritage
4th annual conference, Oct 2019: "Textiles as a historical source" in Kislovodsk, Russia
5th annual conference, 15-16 Nov 2020: "Textiles on the Silk Roads: from Medieval to Industrial Periods" in Trento, Italy

Silk Road Week 
In 2019, IASSRT and the Committee of Silk Road Museums of ICOM China proposed that an annual "Silk Road Week" be held to mark the anniversary of the Silk Road - from Chang'an to the Tianshan Corridor - becoming a World Heritage location on the UNESCO list on 22 June 2014. The first Silk Road Week will be 19-26 June 2020.

External links 
 Official website of the IASSRT

References

international textile organizations
Silk Road
Archaeological organizations